The Faculty of Health and Medical Sciences at the University of Copenhagen houses 13 departments, 29 centres, five schools, four hospitals, and three libraries.

The Faculty educates students in the areas of Human Health and Medical Sciences, Oral Health Sciences, Pharmaceutical Sciences, Veterinary Medicine and Animal Science, Global Health, and the origin and the diversity of Earth and humankind.

In 2021, the Faculty has 8,000 students, including 920 international students, and 5,100 employees, including 3,200 researchers and 1,790 PhD students.

Bente Merete Stallknecht has been the dean at the Faculty since 1 May 2022.

History

The Faculty of Health and Medical Sciences at the University of Copenhagen was established in its current form in 1992 from the merging of Københavns Tandlægehøjskole (The Dental School of Copenhagen) and Det Lægevidenskabelige Fakultet (The Medical Faculty).

The School of Medical Sciences' history dates back to 1479, when the University of Copenhagen was founded. The University of Oslo Faculty of Medicine was founded in 1814 as a de facto Norwegian (partial) continuation of the medical faculty in Copenhagen, as a result of the Napoleonic Wars and the breakup of Denmark-Norway by the foreign powers. The medical faculty in Oslo therefore shared many of its traditions with the Copenhagen faculty. In 1842 the Faculty of Medicine and the Kirurgisk Akademi (Academy of Surgery) were merged to form the Faculty of Medical Science.

An integration of the health education programs was discussed in the late 1970s, and a decade later, the Faculty of Medical Science and the School of Dentistry were merged to form the Faculty of Health Sciences. Buildings built during this time period include the Panum Building. As of January 2016, Panum is the Faculty of Health and Medical Sciences' largest building complex and houses six of the Faculty’s 13 departments.

In 2005, the Center for Health and Society (Danish: Center for Sundhed og Samfund, abbr. CSS) was opened in the former Copenhagen Municipal Hospital in central Copenhagen. As of January 2016, the CSS houses most of the Department of Public Health and the School of Global Health.

The School of Oral Health Sciences operates under the Department of Odontology. Its history dates back the early 1890s, when Denmark's first school of dentistry was founded on Nygade. The school moved its location twice, first in 1894 to Stormgade where the facilities were shared with the Teachers College and a school museum, and in 1928 to Trommesalen. In 1941, the school moved to newly constructed facilities on Jagtvej and changed its name to the School of Dentistry (Tandlægehøjskolen).

During the 1980s, the School of Dentistry was merged into the University of Copenhagen and moved to the recently erected Panum Building. The former School of Dentistry was merged with the university's Faculty of Medical Science to form the Faculty of Health Sciences, and was renamed as the Central Department of Odontology (Odontologisk Centralinstitut). It consisted of two scientific and one clinical section. In the early 1990s, a revision of the dental education program resulted in 60% joint courses with the medical program. In 1993, a new university law was passed and the Department of Odontology received its current designation.

The School of Pharmaceutical Sciences' history dates back to 1892, when the Pharmaceutical College (Den Farmaceutiske Læreanstalt) was founded on Stockholmsgade. In 1942, the Pharmaceutical College moved into a new building at University Park and changed its name to the Danish Pharmaceutical College (Danmarks Farmaceutiske Højskole). In 2003, the Danish Pharmaceutical College was renamed as the Danish University of Pharmaceutical Science (Danmarks Farmaceutiske Universitet).

In 2007, the Danish University of Pharmaceutical Science was merged into the University of Copenhagen and was renamed as the Faculty of Pharmaceutical Sciences. In 2012, the Faculty of Pharmaceutical Sciences merged with the Faculty of Health Sciences and the veterinary part of the Faculty of Life Sciences to form the Faculty of Health and Medical Sciences.

In January 2007, the Royal Veterinary and Agricultural University was merged into the University of Copenhagen and was renamed as the Faculty of Life Sciences. This was later split up, with the veterinary part merging with the Faculty of Health Sciences and the Faculty of Pharmaceutical Sciences to form the Faculty of Health and Medical Sciences and the rest merging into the Faculty of Science.

The Faculty of Health and Medical Sciences received its current name when the Faculty of Health Sciences, the Faculty of Pharmaceutical Sciences, and the veterinary part of the Faculty of Life Sciences were merged in 2012.

Departments

As of December 2021, the Faculty houses thirteen departments, including the Department of Experimental Medicine, which functions as an ividual institute. The following list groups departments under the Faculty's five schools, showing which departments provide the majority of teaching in each study programme:

School of Pharmaceutical Sciences 

 Department of Pharmacy
 Department of Drug Design and Pharmacology

School of Medical Sciences 

 Department of Biomedical Sciences
Biotech Research & Innovation Centre
 Department of Cellular and Molecular Medicine
 Department of Clinical Medicine
 Department of Immunology and Microbiology
 Department of Neuroscience
Department of Forensic Science

School of Oral Health Sciences 

 Department of Odontology (also referred to as the School of Dentistry)
 School of Oral Health Care

School of Veterinary Medicine and Animal Sciences 

Department of Veterinary and Animal Sciences
 Department of Veterinary Clinical Sciences

School of Public Health 

Department of Public Health

Centres of excellence

A large amount of the research at the Faculty is attached to research centres and transverse research collaboration. As of November 2021, the following list groups the current 29 centres of excellence into two groups: centres at faculty level and centres at department level.

Faculty level centres 

 Biotech Research and Innovation Centre (BRIC)
The Novo Nordisk Foundation Center for Protein Research (CPR)
The Novo Nordisk Foundation Center for Basic Metabolic Research (CBMR)
The Novo Nordisk Foundation Center for Stem Cell Medicine (reNEW)
Center for Translational Neuromedicine (CTN)

Department level centres 

 The Center for Healthy Aging (CEHA)
 Copenhagen Center for Glycomics (CCG)
 Center for Chromosome Stability (CCS)
 Center for Biopharmaceuticals and Biobarriers in Drug Delivery
 Center for non-coding RNA in Technology and Health (RTH)
 Center for Peptide-Based Antibiotics (CEPAN)
 Center for Research in Cattle Production and Health (CPH Cattle)
 Center for Research in Mink Production, Health and Welfare (CPH Mink)
 Center for Research in Pig Production and Health (CPH Pig)
Center for Macroecology, Evolution and Climate (CMEC)
Center for Star and Planet Formation (STARPLAN)
 Centre for Medical Parasitology (CMP)
 Copenhagen Center for Disaster Research (COPE)
 Copenhagen Centre for Regulatory Science (CORS)
 Copenhagen Hepatitis C Program (CO-HEP)
 Copenhagen Studies on Asthma in Childhood (COPSAC)
 Coserton Biofilm Center (CBC)
 Danish Research Centre for Migration Ethnicity and Health (MESU)
 LEO Foundation Center for Cutaneous Drug Delivery
 LEO Foundation Skin Immunology Research Center (SIC)
 Lundbeck Foundation Research Initiative on Brain Barriers and Drug Delivery (RIBBDD)
 NEOMUNE Centre (NEOMUNE)
 Novo Nordisk - LIFE in Vivo Pharmacology Centre (LIFEPHARM)
 The Centre for Health Economics and Policy (CHEP)

Studies

The Faculty offers Bachelor’s and Master’s programmes as well as a vocational training programme.

Bachelor’s programmes 
The Faculty offers six three-year Bachelor’s programmes and one three-year vocational Bachelor’s programme. All of these are taught in Danish.

Dentistry, Dental Hygienist, Health Informatics, Medicine, Pharmaceutical Sciences, Public Health, and Veterinary Medicine.

Furthermore, the Faculty offers four collaborative Bachelor’s programmes:

Animal Science, Medicine And Technology, and Molecular Biomedicine.

Master’s Programme 
The Faculty offers a range of Master’s programmes:

Animal Science, Dentistry, Global Health, Health Informatics, Health Science, Human Biology, Immunology and Inflammation, Medical Chemistry, Medicine, Neuroscience, Pharmaceutical Sciences, Pharmacy, Public Health, and Veterinary Medicine

Furthermore, the Faculty offers six collaborative Master’s programmes:

Biology-Biotechnology, Biomedical Engineering, Business Administration and Innovation in Health Care, Environmental Chemistry And Health, Molecular Biomedicine, Quantitative Biology And Disease Modelling

Vocational Training Programme 
The Faculty offers one vocational training programme to become a Dental Chairside Assistant.

References

Further reading

External links
 

University of Copenhagen
Medical schools in Denmark
Dental schools
Pharmacy schools
Veterinary schools in Denmark